John "Jock" McIntyre was a Scottish footballer who played professionally in Scotland, Ireland and the United States.

McIntyre spent his early career with Morton, making over 300 appearances and winning the Scottish Cup with them in 1922. In 1924, he moved to the United States and signed with the Boston Soccer Club of the American Soccer League. While he played right fullback with Morton, McIntyre moved up to wing half with Boston. In his five seasons with Boston, he won the 1928 league title and the 1925 and 1927 League Cup. In July 1929, he moved to Ireland where he was a player-manager with Coleraine. He briefly returned to the United States, playing four games with the Boston Bears during the fall half of the 1931 season.

References

External links
 "Morton's Finest Hour" and "Naked bobby-dazzler"
 

1963 deaths
American Soccer League (1921–1933) players
Boston Bears players
Boston Soccer Club players
Coleraine F.C. players
Petershill F.C. players
Greenock Morton F.C. players
Scottish footballers
Footballers from Greenock
Scottish expatriate footballers
Scottish football managers
Year of birth uncertain
Scottish Junior Football Association players
Scottish Football League players
1890s births
Scottish Football League representative players
Date of death missing
Association football defenders
Scottish expatriate sportspeople in the United States
Expatriate soccer players in the United States
Coleraine F.C. managers
NIFL Premiership players
NIFL Premiership managers
Association football player-managers